Arenimonas aestuarii is a Gram-negative, aerobic and non-motile bacterium from the genus of Arenimonas which has been isolated from estuary sediments from Asan in Korea.

References

External links
Type strain of Arenimonas aestuarii at BacDive -  the Bacterial Diversity Metadatabase

Xanthomonadales
Bacteria described in 2016